Infurcitinea ignicomella is a moth of the family Tineidae. It was described by Heydenreich in 1851. It is found in large parts of Europe, except Ireland, Great Britain, Belgium, the Iberian Peninsula, Ukraine and most of the Balkan Peninsula.

The wingspan is 8–12 mm. The forewings are light brown with three white bands and three costal spots. Adults are on wing from May to August.

The larvae possibly feed on animal matter.

References

Moths described in 1851
Meessiinae
Moths of Europe